chrony is an implementation of the Network Time Protocol (NTP). It's an alternative to ntpd, which is a reference implementation of NTP. It runs on Unix-like operating systems (including Linux and macOS) and is released under the GNU GPL v2. It's the default NTP client and server in Red Hat Enterprise Linux 8 and SUSE Linux Enterprise Server 15, and available in many Linux distributions.

Support for Network Time Security (NTS) was added on version 4.0.

Comparison with the reference implementation 

In contrast to NTPsec, which is a security-focused fork of ntpd, chrony was implemented from scratch. It was designed to synchronize time even in difficult conditions such as intermittent network connections (such as laptops) and congested networks. Some improvements in this regard (compared to reference ntpd) include that it never steps (abruptly adjusts) time outside of startup, can correct for asymmetric network jitters, and can use larger clock rate adjustments on Linux to deal with a broken clock. It typically synchronizes faster and more accurately.

Unlike , it supports synchronizing the system clock via hardware timestamping (i.e. packet times on the network adapter), improving accuracy of time synchronization between machines on a LAN – to the order of 70 nanoseconds (from asymmetry), comparable to Precision Time Protocol. It also supports synchronization by manual input, so as to perform time correction within an isolated network.

 does not implement broadcast, multicast, and manycast modes of operation. It also does not implement the insecure "autokey" authentication. It uses external programs to drive hardware time sources (e.g.  for GNSS), unlike ntpd which has many built-in drivers.

See also 

 OpenNTPD

References

External links 
 

Network time-related software
Free software programmed in C
Software using the GPL license